Md. Akram-Al-Hossain was a Bangladeshi civil servant who is currently serving as the Chairman of Palli Sanchay Bank. He was the Senior Secretary of the Ministry of Primary and Mass Education. He also served as Chairman of Bangladesh Petroleum Corporation.

Biography
Md. Akram-Al-Hossain was born on 1 November 1961 in Hazipur Village of Magura District's Magura Sadar Upazila. He passed MA from Rajshahi University in economics. He joined as an Assistant Commissioner and Magistrate in 1988  He served as Assistant Commissioner (Land), Nezarat Deputy Collector, Land Acquisition Officer and Local Executive Officer of Dhaka City Corporation. He was the Assistant Private Secretary and Private Secretary of the Environment and Forest Minister. He also served as Deputy Secretary of Finance Division, Private Secretary to the Deputy leader of Jatiyo Sangsad and Joint Secretary of Local Government Division.  He served as Additional Secretary of Ministry of Primary and Mass Education from 2016 to 8 May 2018. Then, he was promoted as Secretary In-Charge and he served as Chairman of Bangladesh Petroleum Corporation from 9 May 2018 to 23 September 2018. On October 31, 2020 he retires as Senior secretary.

Personal life
Md. Akram-Al-Hossain married to Khandakar Ferdousi Aktar. They have one son and two daughters.

References 

Living people
Bangladeshi civil servants
1961 births
People from Magura District
University of Rajshahi alumni